Anil Dandekar (born 3 May 1968) is an Indian cricket umpire. In India he has stood in matches in the 2015–16 Ranji Trophy, the 2015–16 Vijay Hazare Trophy and the 2015–16 Syed Mushtaq Ali Trophy. Outside of India, he has stood in matches in the 2015–16 Sunfoil Series in South Africa.

References

External links
 

1968 births
Living people
Indian cricket umpires
Place of birth missing (living people)